|}

The Jockey Club Rose Bowl is a Listed flat horse race in Great Britain open to horses aged three years or older.
It is run at Newmarket over a distance of 2 miles (3,218 metres), and it is scheduled to take place each year in September.

The race was first run, as the Fenwolf Stakes, at Ascot in 2003.  It was given its current name and transferred to Newmarket in 2011.

Winners

See also
 Horse racing in Great Britain
 List of British flat horse races

References 
Racing Post: 

Flat races in Great Britain
Newmarket Racecourse
Open long distance horse races
Recurring sporting events established in 2003
2003 establishments in England